Trulla Bluff is a high, ice-covered bluff forming the eastern extremity of Bristol Island, South Sandwich Islands. This feature was named "Glacier Bluff" during the survey of the island by RRS to avoid duplication. The new name refers to the Norwegian whaling vessel Trulla which visited the islands in 1911.

Cliffs of South Georgia and the South Sandwich Islands